Pethia thelys is a species of cyprinid fish found in streams in Myitkyina and in Lake Indawgyi, Myanmar.  This species can grow to a length of  SL.

References 

Pethia
Fish described in 2008
Barbs (fish)